Henry G. Brinton (born February 21, 1960) is a contributor to The Washington Post and USA Today, and author of the books Balancing Acts: Obligation, Liberation, and Contemporary Christian Conflicts (CSS Publishing, 2006), The Welcoming Congregation: Roots and Fruits of Christian Hospitality (Westminster John Knox Press, 2012), and two mystery novels City of Peace (Koehler Books, 2018) and Windows of the Heavens (Resource Publications, 2021). He is the senior pastor of Fairfax Presbyterian Church, and writes for the preaching journals Homiletics and Proclaim. He lives in Occoquan, Virginia, outside of Washington, D.C. Henry and his wife, Nancy Freeborne-Brinton, have two children, Sarah (Sadie) and Samuel Brinton.

Early years
Henry was born on February 21, 1960, in Washington, D.C., and grew up in Bowie, Maryland. His parents are the late Henry C. Brinton, a NASA scientist, and Mary L. Brinton, a kindergarten teacher. He went to Samuel Ogle Junior High School and, later,  Bowie High School. He then attended Duke University, where he went on an archaeological dig in Israel. This caused Henry to turn to the religious life, which he pursued through studies at Yale Divinity School and parish ministry in the Presbyterian Church (U.S.A.).

He is pastor of the Fairfax Presbyterian Church in Fairfax, Virginia.

Books
In Balancing Acts, Henry makes the case that most controversies in America have religious roots, grounded in an ongoing struggle between obligation-keepers and liberation-seekers.  He believes that obligation and liberation are the two major spiritual themes that animate life in America today, with most people aligning themselves with one of these attitudes.  One group focuses on the obligations of religious life and seeks moral clarity, while the other tends to see religion as a liberation movement and stresses God's love for the oppressed.  And though one might assume that obligation and liberation are synonyms for conservative and liberal, red state and blue state, they are really new fault lines that cut in unexpected and revealing ways through each camp.  In a time of war, for example, it is conservatives who support military action to liberate oppressed people, while liberals speak of the moral obligation of non-violence.

The Welcoming Congregation unpacks the roots of hospitality, looking at hospitality in the Bible and in church tradition before highlighting specific practices to welcome and nurture people. Congregations that pay attention to first impressions are successful in attracting strangers, and those that further disciple those visitors through meals and small groups deepen people’s connections to God and each other. The book then explores the fruits of hospitality, describing how congregations rooted in hospitality are able to grow in reconciliation, outreach, and ever-broadening perceptions of God.

City of Peace is a fast-paced mystery novel that engages people politically and spiritually, leaving them with fresh insight into how they can overcome polarizing divisions among people of differing cultures and faiths.  When Methodist minister Harley Camden loses his wife and daughter in a European terrorist attack, he spirals downward into grief and anger. The bishop forces him to move to a tiny church in small-town Occoquan, Virginia, to heal and recover. But all hope for serenity is quickly shattered by the mysterious murder of the daughter of the local Iraqi baker, followed by the threat of an attack by Islamic extremists. Harley tries to build bridges to his neighbors, including Muslims and Coptic Christians, and digs into the history of the ancient Galilean city of Sepphoris to find the secret to survival in a fractured and violent world. Past and present come together in surprising ways as Harley sets out to stop the violence and save his new flock. 

Windows of the Heavens is the sequel to City of Peace, and it explores how people can coexist in an interfaith, multicultural community, and how humans can establish a sustainable relationship with the natural world around them. When the heavens open on the small river town of Occoquan, Virginia, the streets flood and a candle shop is swept away. Pastor Harley Camden witnesses the destructive deluge and then discovers, in the debris, a dead man with a crude carving of Satan’s claws in his back. Harley is drawn into the mystery of what caused the flood and who killed the man, while diving into questions of good and evil, body and spirit, humanity and the environment—especially questions about the change in climate that now threatens life around the globe. He discovers that there is a spiritual dimension to every social issue, whether it be the violence of Central American gangs or the racism that leads a black businessman to make a fateful choice.

Ten Commandments of Faith and Fitness, a book written with co-author Vik Khanna, is grounded in Henry's experience as an endurance athlete. Henry has completed a marathon, century (100-mile) bike ride, or sprint triathlon every year since 2000.

References

External links
Henry G. Brinton
Fairfax Presbyterian Church Homepage
Homiletics Online Homepage
CSS Publishing Company

American male writers
1960 births
Living people
Duke University alumni
Yale Divinity School alumni
People from Bowie, Maryland